Ezekiel Miller (born July 27, 1998), also known professionally as Ez Mil, is a Filipino-American rapper, singer, and songwriter currently signed under Virgin Music/MCA Music, Inc.

He gained fame in 2021 after his performance of his song "Panalo (Trap Cariñosa)" on the Wish Bus USA went viral, amassing millions of views in just a few days after premiering on YouTube on January 29. Ez Mil's song also attracted controversy for a historically inaccurate verse saying Lapu-Lapu was beheaded.

Early life 
Ezekiel Miller was born in Olongapo to a musician father, Paul Sapiera of the band RockStar whose hits in the early '90s include "Mahal Pa Rin Kita" and "Parting Time", and to a mother who is also active in the music industry.

He grew up in the Philippines and studied Architecture at Saint Louis University in Baguio before moving to the United States. He currently lives in Las Vegas, Nevada.

Discography

Studio albums

Singles

References

External links

1998 births
Living people
Filipino rappers
Filipino emigrants to the United States
People from Olongapo
21st-century Filipino male singers